The 2013 Carolina RailHawks FC season was the club's seventh season of existence, and their third season in the North American Soccer League, the second division of American soccer.

Background

Review

Competitions

Preseason

NASL

Spring season

Fall season

U.S. Open Cup

Statistics

Appearances and goals 

|}

Transfers

References 

2013
Carolina RailHawks Fc
Carolina RailHawks Fc
2013 in sports in North Carolina